Joan McSheehy (July 22, 1913 – April 16, 1948), also known by her married name Joan Huffman, was an American competition swimmer who represented the United States at the 1932 Summer Olympics in Los Angeles, California.  McSheehy finished fifth overall in the final of the women's 100-meter backstroke with a time of 1:23.2.

External links
 

1913 births
1948 deaths
American female backstroke swimmers
Olympic swimmers of the United States
Swimmers at the 1932 Summer Olympics
20th-century American women
20th-century American people